Shallogan's Halt railway station served the area of Straboy in County Donegal, Ireland.

The station opened on 1 July 1903 on the Donegal Railway Company line from Glenties to Stranorlar.

It closed on 15 December 1947 when the County Donegal Railways Joint Committee  closed the line from Glenties to Stranorlar in an effort to save money.

Freight services on the route continued until 10 March 1952.

Routes

References

Disused railway stations in County Donegal
Railway stations opened in 1903
Railway stations closed in 1947
1903 establishments in Ireland
1947 disestablishments in Ireland
Railway stations in the Republic of Ireland opened in the 20th century